The Australian flag debate is a periodic question over whether the Australian flag should be changed, particularly to remove the Union Jack from the canton, but also to possibly introduce a completely new design without the Southern Cross. Acknowledgement of the significance of the issues, and corresponding changes are required to reflect Australia's multicultural society, as well as to reflect Australia's immensely rich, and intricate and complex shared history.

The debate has often arisen in connection with the issue of republicanism in Australia. It has come to a head on a number of occasions, such as the period immediately preceding the Australian Bicentenary in 1988 and during the prime ministership of Paul Keating, who had publicly raised the topic of flag change during the early 1990s.

Arguments for a new flag

The case for changing the flag has been led by the organisation known as Ausflag. The organisation has not consistently supported one design but is opposed to the Eureka Flag and has sponsored a number of design competitions to develop alternative flag candidates.

Supporters of changing the flag have made the following arguments:

 The flag is not distinctive because it contains the national flag of another country in a position of prominence. In particular, the flag is difficult to distinguish from a variety of flags based on the British Blue Ensign, most notably the national flag of New Zealand and the state flag of Victoria. For example, when Australian prime minister Bob Hawke visited Canada in 1984, Ottawa was decked out with New Zealand flags in his honour. The Australian Monarchist League, during their "No" campaign for the Australian republic referendum in 1999, displayed the New Zealand flag instead of the Australian flag in one of their pamphlets. Again in 2013, the Australian Monarchist League mistakenly captioned the New Zealand flag as being the Australian flag on their website. In 2018, a news piece about Australia Day on Nine News Queensland, the background graphics showed New Zealand flags instead of the Australian flags.
 It does not accurately connote Australia's status as an independent nation. The Union Jack at the canton suggests Australia is a British colony or dependency. New Zealand, Tuvalu and Fiji are the only other independent nations in the world to feature the Union Jack on their national flags. Other Commonwealth countries whose flags originally depicted the Union Jack have since changed them without becoming republics, while Canada, whose official pre-1965 national flag was the Union Jack, also adopted a new flag design without becoming a republic. The Australian flag's colours of red, white and blue are neither Australia's official national colours (green and gold) nor its traditional heraldic colours (blue and gold).
 The current design for the flag serves as a reminder for Aboriginal Australians regarding a period in Australian history where "the rights of Indigenous people were overlooked", and as such "symbolises dispossession and oppression" and "doesn’t reflect the reality of Australian life."
 The Australian flag is historically not the prime national symbol. For most of the time since Federation, it was flown alongside the British Union Jack which took precedence as the national flag from 1924 to 1954. Until the late 1920s, the Australian Federation Flag remained more popular than the Australian flag for public and even some official events. For example, the Federation Flag was flown during the 1927 visit to Australia of the Duke and Duchess of York. The number of points of the stars have varied since 1901 and the present blue version was not adopted as the "national" flag until 1954. Before then, the Union Jack took precedence and confusion reigned between whether the red or blue version of the Australian flag was to be preferred, with the red often winning out.
 It is spurious to claim that Australians have "fought and died under the flag", given that during most of the wars Australians have been involved in, they have usually "fought under" various British flags or the Australian Red Ensign. Prior to 1941 only 10 percent of military ensigns were Blue and in 1945 Red ensigns were flown along the route of the official end of war parades. The flag made in secret by the Changi prisoners-of-war was a red ensign. The coffins of Australia's war dead were draped with the Union Jack.
 Although the flag was designed by four Australians, including two teenagers, and a man from New Zealand and chosen through a public competition, the conditions of entry for the Review of Reviews competition – which was integrated into the government initiative – were highly suggestive that the winning design must include the Union Jack and Southern Cross, and final approval lay with King Edward VII and, because both the red and blue versions were considered naval ensigns, the British Admiralty.
 There are 56 countries in the Commonwealth of Nations – only five of them, including the United Kingdom, have the Union Jack in their own flag.

Arguments for the current flag

The Australian National Flag Association was formed to maintain the status quo.

Opponents of changing the flag have made the following arguments:

 It is a popular symbol. No alternative national flag has attained the same degree of acceptance accorded to the existing flag.
 The flag is a unique combination of devices recognised by law, custom and tradition as Australia's chief national symbol. It represents all Australian citizens regardless of background, race, religion or age.  
 According to Nigel Morris of the Australian Flag Society, it is of historical importance, being the flag "that Australia has grown up under, and the flag that has been associated with all of her many achievements on the international scene". 
 The flag is popular generally, and has particular support among young Australians, who do not appear to consider it a colonial symbol.  The flag was the first national flag ever produced by a competition amongst the citizens themselves.  The three elements of the flag represent Australia's heritage and values: the Southern Cross indicates Australia's geographic position, and is highly significant in Aboriginal mythology;  the Union Jack acknowledges the large British settlements, which brought with them the national language, parliamentary government, and the rule of law;  the "Commonwealth Star" represents the shared democratic future, the "ballot not the bullet".. 
 It was chosen through an open public competition. The competition was won by five entrants who had submitted similar designs, four Australians and a man from New Zealand, who would share the honour of being declared the designers.

Southern Cross

The Southern Cross is thought to represent Australia's position in the Southern Hemisphere (see Southern Cross Flag). It has been used as a symbol of Australia since in the 1820s when there were crown colonies of the British Empire in Australia. The National Colonial Flag for Australia was the first such concept to depict the Southern Cross.

Some claim that the Southern Cross is not explicitly Australian but could represent any nation in the Southern Hemisphere. As well as the Australian flag, it also already appears on the flags of Brazil, Papua New Guinea, Samoa, New Zealand and the Mercosur trade bloc.

Progress of the debate
When the winning entry to the 1901 Federal Flag Design Competition was announced the initial reception was mixed. The then-republican magazine The Bulletin labelled it:
a staled réchauffé of the British flag, with no artistic virtue, no national significance... Minds move slowly: and Australia is still Britain's little boy. What more natural than that he should accept his father's cut-down garments, – lacking the power to protest, and only dimly realising his will. That bastard flag is a true symbol of the bastard state of Australian opinion.

Initially the Department of Defence resisted, considering it to be a marine ensign and favouring King's Regulations that specified the use of the Union Jack. After being approached by the Department of Defence, Prime Minister Chris Watson stated in parliament that he was not satisfied with the design of the Australian flag and that implementation of the 1904 resolution could wait until consideration was given to "adopt another [flag] which in our opinion is more appropriate."

On 14 April 1954 the Flags Act 1953 (Cth) became law after receiving all-party support. Tabling the legislation in parliament, the Prime Minister, Robert Menzies, stated: "The bill is very largely a formal measure which puts into legislative form what has become almost the established practice in Australia."

The first proposal for a new Australian flag was made in 1956 by the Republican Socialist League. It was an evolutionary design in which the Union Jack was replaced with the Commonwealth Star.

The Bulletin magazine launched an Australian National Flag Quest on 1 August 1971 in time for the visit of Queen Elizabeth II to open the Sydney Opera House in October 1973; 10 designs were chosen from the 2,000 submitted and these were displayed by major stores in the capital cities and main provincial centres during 1972.

At the July 1982 National Conference of the Australian Labor Party in Canberra, the party changed its policy platform in regard to national symbols to: "Initiate and Support moves to establish with popular acceptance an Australian flag ... which will more distinctively reflect our national independence and identity."

It was reported in The Australian newspaper on 28 January 1984 that, "It is understood that Federal Cabinet will soon decide how best to ignite the debate on the pros and cons of changing the flag before the issue is put to a national vote before the 1988 bicentenary year. The Minister for Housing and Construction Mr Chris Hurford publicly revealed yesterday that the Government had not allowed economic discussions to completely swamp cabinet debate on the flag."

The prime minister, Bob Hawke, subsequently announced in the House of Representatives that the design of the Australian flag would not be reviewed by the Australian government before or during the bicentenary year.

Paul Keating publicly championed the cause of a new flag during his term as prime minister, including on a state visit to Indonesia. He was quoted as saying:
I do not believe that the symbols and the expression of the full sovereignty of Australian nationhood can ever be complete while we have a flag with the flag of another country on the corner of it.

On 6 June 1994, the Sydney Morning Herald reported the deputy prime minister, Kim Beazley, as saying that the Labor government was committed to its timetable for changes to Australia's flag by the Centenary of Federation in 2001; beyond commissioning a national survey that year, no further action was taken.

In opposition from 1983 to 1996, coalition MPs unsuccessfully sponsored 10 private members bills to amend the Flags Act 1953 (Cth) to prevent the existing Australian flag from being replaced by the agreement of both houses of federal parliament alone, without the views of the Australian people being taken into account.

Frequent Morgan polls showed the percentage of Australians wanting a new flag increasing from 27% in 1979 to 42% in 1992, to a majority of 52% in 1998. In response to polls showing increasing support for a new flag, the Coalition government under John Howard established Australian National Flag Day in 1996 and introduced legislation, the Flags Amendment Bill 1996, to make a change more difficult. In 2002, the Howard government supplied ANFA's promotional video free to all primary schools and in 2004 required all schools receiving federal funds to fly the Australian flag.

In the 1997 film Event Horizon, set in the year 2047, Sam Neill, playing an Australian astronaut, wears an Australian flag patch on his spacesuit with the Union Jack in the canton replaced with the Australian Aboriginal Flag. This was at Neill's suggestion, as he thought the flag might have been changed by that point in the future.

On 24 March 1998, the Flags Amendment Bill 1996 received Royal Assent.

Malcolm Turnbull, former chairman (1993–2000) of the Australian Republican Movement and head of the official "Yes" case committee for the 1999 Australian republic referendum, left the board of Ausflag in 1994 after being asked for his resignation and in 2004 joined the Australian National Flag Association.

A 2010 Morgan Poll that asked: "Do you think Australia should have a new design for our National Flag?" was supported by 29% of respondents and opposed by 66%, with 5% uncommitted.

In 2015, with the flag debate in New Zealand continuing, discussion on the Australian Flag has risen in the media. This includes the issue being raised publicly by Labor MP Tim Watts.

One of the influential flags designs raised into the public debate in 2015 has been the Golden Wattle Flag. It takes the golden wattle blossom as the central motive creating a negative space Commonwealth seven-pointed star. The Golden Wattle is one of Australia's first national symbols dating back to Lord Hobart. It is an endemic tree to Australia which served as a source of food and medicament as well as wood for the boomerangs for the Aboriginal peoples. It is Australia's official floral emblem and it is the reason behind Australia's national colors.

In 2016, designer and social entrepreneur Murray Bunton created the Unity Flag.

See also

 Flags Act 1953 (Commonwealth of Australia)
 List of Australian flags
 List of proposed Australian flags
 Great Canadian flag debate
 New Zealand flag debate
 Northern Ireland flags issue

References

Flags of Australia
National symbols of Australia
Flag controversies
Republicanism in Australia